Robert Graham (1735 – 11 December 1797), who took the name Bontine in 1770 and Cunninghame Graham in 1796, was a Scottish politician and poet. He is now remembered for a poem If doughty deeds my lady please, which was later set to music by his great-great-grandson, Rev. Malise Cunninghame Graham and also by Sir Arthur Sullivan.

Early life
Robert, the second son of Nicol Graham of Gartmore and Lady Margaret Cunningham, was born at Gartmore, Perthshire, and educated, along with his elder brother William, at the University of Glasgow (matriculating under Professor Andrew Rosse). 

He spent much of his early life in Jamaica, where he was a planter, slave-owner and merchant, and became Receiver-General for Taxes in 1753 and profited from his involvement in sugar plantations in the Caribbean.

Slave holder in Jamaica
Graham writes in his letters of numerous liaisons with enslaved women and this infers he is likely to have fathered children by them. 

As a wealthy businessman, Cunninghame acquired enslaved people as domestic servants, oversaw large groups of enslaved plantation workers and later sold the enslaved people he 'owned' when he and Anne Taylor returned to Scotland.

In 1752, Graham left Britain for the Colony of Jamaica, where he was a slave-owner, landowner and planter, politician, and public servant until 1770. By 1753, aged 18, he was the receiver-general of taxes.

Graham represented the parish of St David in the Assembly of Jamaica (1765–67).

By 1770, he left Jamaica for Britain and became laird of Ardoch in Dunbartonshire. He had succeeded to the estate, (entailed upon him in 1757), on the death of his second cousin William Bontine in the late 1760s.

Family and marriage
While in Jamaica, Graham married Anne Taylor, sister of Sir John Taylor Baronet of Lyssons Hall, in 1764 (as recorded in the Cunninghame Graham Family Bible) and Simon Taylor, one of Jamaica's wealthiest merchants and plantation-owners.

He built the current Ardoch House (near Dumbarton) in colonial style for Anne.  

Anne died in December 1780, leaving two daughters and two sons.  He secondly married Elizabeth Buchanan circa 1783, by whom he had a further son and daughter; they separated in 1787 and divorced in 1789.

Property
He changed name twice; firstly, under the terms of an entail by which he inherited the Ardoch estate from William Bontine, he took the surname Bontine until his father died. Secondly, in line with the 1709 entail of William 12th Earl of Glencairn, he assumed the name and arms of Cunninghame, in addition to those of Graham, on the death in 1796 of Maj. Gen. John Cunninghame, 15th Earl of Glencairn and last in line.

From him Robert inherited the Finlaystone estate, so that he is often known as Robert Cunninghame Graham of Gartmore and Finlaystone. At his death, his estates stretched from Perthshire (Gartmore & Kippen), through Dunbartonshire (Galingad & Ardoch) and across the Clyde to Renfrewshire (Finlaystone); in addition he held the lands of Lochwood in Lanarkshire and his Jamaican plantation at Roaring River.

Political career
Graham was elected a Member of Parliament, representing Stirlingshire, in 1794. He was a pro-Jacobin of that time, and identified as a Radical. During his time in the House he attempted to introduce a Bill of Rights which foreshadowed the Reform Bill of 1832.

He was a close friend of Thomas Sheridan, Charles James Fox, Sir Thomas Dundas (later 1st Baron Dundas) and the poet Hector McNeil.

Graham was appointed Rector of the University of Glasgow, holding the position from 1785 to 1787, in which year he instituted the Gartmore Gold Medal (awarded biennially) for the best discourse by a student on political liberty.

Death and legacy
In later life he suffered from frequent bouts of gout in the organs. He died at Gartmore on 4 December 1797 and was interred in the Gartmore family burial ground.

Robert Burns – whose patron James, 14th Earl of Glencairn, was Graham's first cousin – writing to the Edinburgh bookseller, Mr Hill, describes Graham as: "...the noblest instance of great talents, great fortune and great worth that ever I saw in conjunction."

Descendants
Graham's great-great-grandson, Robert Bontine Cunninghame Graham was a writer, journalist and adventurer. He was also a notable politician, being a Liberal Party MP. and a founder of both the Scottish Labour Party and the National Party of Scotland.

His great-great-great-grandson, Admiral Sir Angus Edward Malise Bontine Cunninghame Graham of Gartmore and Ardoch KBE CB was Royal Navy Flag Officer, Scotland. He was nephew and heir to Robert Bontine Cunningham Graham.

Footnotes

References
R. B. Cunninghame Graham, (1925) Doughty Deeds, an account of the life of Robert Graham of Gartmore, poet and politician, 1735–1797   London: William Heinemann Ltd.
Joseph Foster. (1882) Members of Parliament, Scotland, including the minor barons, the commissioners for the shires, and the commissioners for the burghs, 1357–1882. On the basis of the parliamentary return 1880, with genealogical and biographical notices. (2nd Ed.) Aylesbury: Hazell, Watson, and Viney.
The University of Glasgow Story http://www.universitystory.gla.ac.uk/biography/?id=WH0240&type=P .  Retrieved 2009-04-07.

Rectors of the University of Glasgow
1735 births
1797 deaths
Members of the Parliament of Great Britain for Scottish constituencies
Politics of Stirling (council area)
Scottish people of the British Empire
People from Stirling (council area)
Alumni of the University of Glasgow
Scottish merchants
British radicals
Tax collectors
British MPs 1790–1796
18th-century Scottish businesspeople
18th-century Jamaican people
18th-century Jamaican writers
18th-century Scottish poets
Planters of Jamaica